The Peștiș is a left tributary of the river Cerna in Romania. It discharges into the Cerna in Peștișu Mare.

References

Rivers of Romania
Rivers of Hunedoara County